OYSS Women is a non-profit organization engaged in empowering women in India. It was founded in 1987 by women's rights activist Manasi Pradhan.

Activities

The organization undertakes activities in the field of women education, vocational training, leadership development, women's rights enforcement, self-defense training and legal awareness with the objective of empowering women.

Model UN
OYSS Women Model UN is a national-level conference of university and college students. The conference sits in different formations i.e. General Assembly, Security Council, UN Secretariat and Press & Publicity division.
Participants debate contemporary women issues and are awarded gold, silver or bronze medals based on their performance.

Events
Some of the periodic events organized by OYSS Women includes Nirbhaya Samaroh, Women Leadership Conclave, National Meet on Rural Women Empowerment, National Meet on Ending Violence against women, National Meet on Liquor Trade & Gender Violence and women's rights festival.

References

Feminist organisations in India